Beth Maureen Doglio (born 1965) is an American politician and activist who serves as a member of the Washington House of Representatives for Washington's 22nd legislative district. In 2022 she ran for election to the other representative position in Washington's 22nd legislative district to replace retiring representative Laurie Dolan.

Education 
Doglio earned a Bachelor of Arts degree in political science and telecommunication from Indiana University in 1987.

Career 
During the 1988 Democratic Party presidential primaries, Doglio was a state director for Senator Paul Simon's campaign. After moving to Washington, she was an employee at Seattle Public Utilities and Telcordia Technologies. Doglio was the founding executive director of Washington Conservation Voters, serving from 1991 to 1995. In 1996, she worked as a field organizer for NARAL. She also worked as an organizer for Peace Action. Doglio is a progressive, and has advocated Medicare for All, immigration reform, Green New Deal legislation, and the expansion of public housing in the Puget Sound region.

2020 congressional election 
She faced former state representative Kristine Reeves and former Tacoma mayor Marilyn Strickland, among others, in the nonpartisan blanket primary. Doglio came in second and lost to Strickland in the general election.

Personal life 
Doglio is married to Eddy Cates, a family physician in Lacey, Washington. They have two children. Doglio is openly bisexual.

References

External links

1965 births
Living people
21st-century American politicians
Bisexual politicians
Bisexual women
Indiana University alumni
LGBT state legislators in Washington (state)
Democratic Party members of the Washington House of Representatives
Women state legislators in Washington (state)
21st-century American women politicians
21st-century LGBT people